Carl-Michael Eide (born 24 July 1974) is a Norwegian black metal musician, multi-instrumentalist, and vocalist. He is also known under stage names Aggressor, Czral and Exhurtum.

Biography
Carl-Michael Eide has played in various black metal and avant-garde metal bands. These include Ved Buens Ende, Aura Noir, Cadaver, Dødheimsgard, Satyricon, Ulver, Infernö and recently the jazz/rock band Virus. His drumming is unusual in style, with very little repetition and a tendency to shy away from traditional drumming.

His singing abilities are diverse. Other than usual harsh vocals in black metal, he uses a form of croon in the avant-garde metal bands Ved Buens Ende and Virus.

He has gone back to playing guitar and was writing music for the re-grouped Ved Buens Ende, before the band once again split up in early 2007.  Beyond that, he continues to write material for Aura Noir and Virus.

He was also a session drummer for Dimmu Borgir on their 1997 tour.

On 26 March 2005 he fell from a four-story building and spent several months in hospital. He has lost the use of his feet as a result of the incident. He is not able to play drums anymore, but is still active as a vocalist, guitarist and bassist.

Discography
With Satyricon
All Evil (EP) (1992)

With Ulver
Vargnatt (Demo) (1993)

With Ved Buens Ende
Those Who Caress the Pale (Demo) (1994)
Written in Waters (1995)

With Aura Noir
Dreams Like Deserts (EP) (1995)
Black Thrash Attack (1996)
Deep Tracts of Hell (1998)
The Merciless (2004)
Hades Rise (2008)
Out to Die (2012)
Aura Noire (2018)
Belligerent 'Til Death (Single) (2019)

With Infernö
Utter Hell (1996)
Downtown Hades (1997)

With Dødheimsgard
666 International (1999)
Supervillain Outcast (2007)

With Virus
Carheart (2003)
The Black Flux (2008)
The Agent That Shapes the Desert (2011)
Oblivion Clock (EP) (2012)
Memento Collider (2016)
Investigator (EP) (2017)

With Cadaver
Discipline (2001)
Necrosis (2004)

Guest appearances
Fleurety, Department of Apocalyptic Affairs (2000)
Ulver, Blood Inside (2005)
Zweizz, The Yawn of the New Age (2007)
Darkthrone, F.O.A.D. (2007)
Hexvessel, Dawnbearer (2011)

References

Sources
Interview with Carl-Michael Eide
Interview with Carl-Michael Eide, December 2008

1974 births
Living people
Norwegian black metal musicians
Norwegian heavy metal drummers
Male drummers
Norwegian heavy metal guitarists
Norwegian heavy metal singers
Norwegian male singers
Norwegian multi-instrumentalists
Norwegian rock guitarists
Norwegian rock singers
Place of birth missing (living people)
Death metal musicians
Satyricon (band) members
Ulver members
Cadaver (band) members
Aura Noir members
21st-century Norwegian drummers